The Warrnambool line is a regional passenger rail service operated by V/Line in Victoria, Australia. It serves passengers between the state capital, Melbourne, and the regional city of Warrnambool.

History
In 1993, passenger services on the line were contracted by the State Government to a private company, West Coast Railway. That arrangement lasted until 2004, when the contract was handed back to the government, and V/Line resumed the operation of Warrnambool services. Three new stations have opened on the line since then: Marshall station in 2004, Sherwood Park station, near Warrnambool, in 2006, and Waurn Ponds station in 2014.

Services

Four services operate on weekdays and three on weekends (and public holidays) in each direction. On weekdays, all Melbourne-bound services operate express between Geelong and Southern Cross, stopping only at Footscray. Each -bound service operates to different stopping patterns; however, all services operate express between Southern Cross and Lara, with an intermediate stop at Footscray.

All services operate express between Deer Park and Footscray, and between Footscray and Southern Cross.

Warrnambool trains are classified by V/Line as a long-distance service, so first-class accommodation is available and an on-board snack bar is provided. Locomotive-hauled N-class carriages are used. In December 2018, due to a lack of available rollingstock, H carriages were used on the line past Geelong for the first time.

After 22 December 2013, following the opening of the first section of  the Regional Rail Link (RRL) from Southern Cross to South Kensington, Warrnambool services no longer stopped at North Melbourne station.

From 12 October 2014, V/Line Warrnambool train services began stopping at the new Waurn Ponds station as part of the extension of Geelong line services to that location.

On 21 June 2015, the new RRL line from Manor Junction to Deer Park West opened. Consequently, Warrnambool trains began to run via Wyndham Vale and Tarneit stations, rather than via Werribee and Newport stations on the Werribee Line.

From 29 January 2017, V/Line started running a fourth service in both directions on weekdays, and Sunday road coach services were replaced by trains, so that three Sunday train services run in both directions instead of two. Following a timetable change on 27 August 2017, weekday Warrnambool trains no longer serve Wyndham Vale or Tarneit stations.

In 2019, upgrades are scheduled to be completed that will allow V/Locity railcars to travel to Warrnambool. These upgrades include new signalling, level crossing upgrades and a crossing loop at Boorcan, near Camperdown.

See also
West Coast Railway (Victoria)

References

External links
 http://www.vline.com.au
 Official map
 Rail Geelong: Line History

V/Line rail services
Warrnambool
Transport in Geelong
Transport in the City of Maribyrnong
Public transport routes in the City of Melbourne (LGA)
Transport in the City of Brimbank
Transport in the City of Wyndham
Transport in Barwon South West (region)